is a village located in Nagano Prefecture, Japan. , the village had an estimated population of 552 in 274 households, and a population density of 13 persons per km².

Geography
Urugi is located mountainous southern border of Nagano Prefecture with Aichi Prefecture at an altitude of 800 meters, surrounded by 1000 meter mountains. Over 80 percent of the village area is forested. The Iwakura Dam is located in Urugi.

Surrounding municipalities
 Nagano Prefecture
 Anan
 Neba
 Hiraya
 Aichi Prefecture
 Toyone

Climate
The town has a climate characterized by hot and humid summers, and cold winters (Köppen climate classification Cfa).  The average annual temperature in Urugi is 11.0 °C. The average annual rainfall is 2106 mm with September as the wettest month. The temperatures are highest on average in August, at around 22.8 °C, and lowest in January, at around -0.7 °C.

Demographics
Per Japanese census data, the population of Urugi has decreased over the past 70 years.

History
The area of present-day Urugi was part of ancient Shinano Province. The village of Toyo was established on April 1, 1889 with the establishment of the modern municipalities system. Toyo Village dissolved on July 1, 1948, with a portion annexed by neighboring Anan, and the remainder becoming the village of Urugi.

Economy
The economy of Urugi is agricultural, with corn, rice, shiitake and scallions as main crops.

Education
Urugi has one public elementary school and one public middle school operated by the village government. The village does not have a high school.

Transportation

Railway
The village does not have any passenger railway service

Highway

References

External links
 
Official Website 

 
Villages in Nagano Prefecture